Nuno Miguel Santos Barreto, ComIH (born 29 April 1972) is a Portuguese competitive sailor and Olympic medalist.

He won a bronze medal in the 470 class at the 1996 Summer Olympics in Atlanta, along with his partner Hugo Rocha.

At the 1996 470-European-Sailing-Championship he won with his Partner Hugo Rocha the silver medal.

References

External links
 
 
 

1972 births
Living people
Sportspeople from Lisbon
Portuguese male sailors (sport)
Sailors at the 1996 Summer Olympics – 470
Sailors at the 2000 Summer Olympics – Tornado
Sailors at the 2004 Summer Olympics – Tornado
Olympic sailors of Portugal
Olympic bronze medalists for Portugal
Olympic medalists in sailing
Medalists at the 1996 Summer Olympics